The Eggerbach is a river in Upper Franconia in the south German state of Bavaria. It flows into the Regnitz in the municipality of Eggolsheim.

See also
List of rivers of Bavaria

References

Rivers of Bavaria
Rivers of Germany